The following table contains the Indian states and union territories along with the most spoken scheduled languages used in the region. These are based on the 2011 census of India figures. (Note: Telangana and Andhra Pradesh statistics are based on the 2001 census of Andhra Pradesh)

See also
 Languages of India
 Languages with official status in India and its list of official languages by states.

References

 
language